Nzérékoré Airport  is an airport serving Nzérékoré in Guinea.

The Nzerekore (non-directional beacon) (Ident: NZ) is located just west of the airport.

See also

Transport in Guinea
List of airports in Guinea

References

External links
 OpenStreetMap - Nzérékoré
 OurAirports - Nzérékoré
 FallingRain - Nzérékoré Airport
 
 Google Earth

Airports in Guinea
Nzérékoré